Patricia Linares is a Colombian lawyer and judge. She served as the Founding President of the Special Jurisdiction for Peace (SJP) from November 4, 2017 until November 4, 2020. In 2020, she was voted Colombia Reports' personality of the year for her "ability to fence off attacks and deescalate tensions" at the SJP.

External links 

 Interview on the occasion of the conclusion of her three years in office as President of the Special Jurisdiction for Peace (in Spanish): https://www.semana.com/semana-tv/semana-en-vivo/articulo/entrevista-a-la-presidenta-de-la-jep-patricia-linares/202012/.

References 

Colombian lawyers
Living people
Year of birth missing (living people)